Clement Garing (17 December 1873 – 1951 at Melbourne, Victoria) was a cricket Test match umpire. 

He umpired one Test match, between Australia and England, played at Melbourne on 1 January to 8 January 1925.  This match was won by Australia in spite of a 283 run opening partnership by Jack Hobbs and Herbert Sutcliffe, the latter scoring centuries in each innings, the first time this had occurred against Australia.  Garing's colleague was Bob Crockett.

In all, Garing umpired 10 first-class matches, all of them in Melbourne and most of them in partnership with Bob Crockett, between December 1921 and December 1925.

See also
 List of Test cricket umpires

References

External links
 

Australian Test cricket umpires
1873 births
1951 deaths